Al-Hafiz Zain al-Din 'Abd al-Rahim al-'Iraqi (1403-1325) was a renowned Kurdish Shafi'i scholar and was the foremost leading hadith scholar at his time.

Biography
He is called: Al-Iraqi, relative to Iraq, because his origin is Kurdish, from a town called Erbil then his father moved to Egypt when he was young, grew up there, and married a righteous, worshiping woman who gave birth to him. He was born in the year of 1325 in Manshiyet Al-Mahrani on the shore of the Nile river. His parents were known to be righteous and pious and his father died when he was three years old. He memorized the Noble Qur’an when he was just eight years old, and memorized other books such as “Al-Tanbih”, “Al-Hawi”, “Imam”, and his first occupation was in the science of readings, and he looked into jurisprudence and its origins, and advanced in them. His teacher Jamal al-Din al-Isnawi was praising his understanding, appreciating his words, and listening to his discussions.  

Then he came to the knowledge of hadith with a sign from al-Izz ibn Jama’a, so he learned from the scholars of his country, then he travelled to seek hadith in the countries of the Levant and elsewhere. He met with Sheikh al-Islam Taqi al-Din al-Subki and began studying under him for a number of years. He used to do Hajj and live nearby in Makkah Al-Mukarramah, and he worked hard, copied, read and listened until he became the great Ḥafiẓ of his time, as his peers said about him. He was a scholar of grammar, language, strangers, readings, hadith, jurisprudence and its origins, but he was dominated by the art of hadith, so he became famous for it, and became unrivalled in this field.

Students
Among his many students, his most renowned ones include:  

 Wali al-Din al-'Iraqi
 Nur al-Din al-Haythami
 Ibn Hajar al-Asqalani
 Ibn al-'Ajmi
 Musa Al-Damiri
 Al-Qalqashandi

Death
Al-Iraqi died in 1403 at the age of 78.

Works
Al-Iraqi was an author of renowned works in the sciences of Hadith.
 At-Taqyid Wal-Idah''', best commentary on Muqaddimah Ibn as-Salah
 Ikhbar al-Ahya’ bi Akhbar al-Ihya, an exhaustive work on Ihyaa 'Uloom al-Deen where he grades the hadith.
 Tahrib al-Tathreeb fi Sharh al-Taqrib Alfiat Al-Hadith Alfiat Al-Iraqi Fi Usul Al-Fiqh & Matn Minhaj Al-Wusul Li-L-Baydawi Kitab fi Almurasalati Al Tahrir fi 'Usul al Fiqh Nazm al-Durar al-Saniyya fi Sir al-Zakiyah Al alfiat fi al Quran al Gharib Sharh al-Tirmidhi''

See also 
 List of Ash'aris and Maturidis

References 

Shafi'is
Mujaddid
Hadith scholars
Sunni Muslim scholars of Islam
1325 births
1403 deaths
14th-century Muslim scholars of Islam
14th-century jurists
15th-century jurists
Biographical evaluation scholars
14th-century Kurdish people
15th-century Kurdish people